Morpho theseus, the Theseus morpho, is a Neotropical butterfly. It is found in Panama, Costa Rica, Mexico, Colombia, Peru, Ecuador, Venezuela, Honduras and Guatemala.

Description
In 1913, Hans Fruhstorfer wrote:
"Morpho theseus apparently replaces hercules in Central America and the Andean region. It is less constant than hercules, inclining to geographical and probably also to climatic variation, has somewhat narrower wings than hercules and is distinguished from all other Morphids by the long, pointed teeth of the hindwing." 
Note: Morpho amphitryon, which was considered a race of Morpho theseus by Fruhstorfer, also has the "pointed teeth" or scalloping.

Ground colour brown inclining to olive green, base only quite faintly suffused with whitish. Cell black brown at the extremity and with an inconspicuous whitish spot before the apex. Forewing with only two distinct rows of yellowish patches.

Many subspecies have been described.

Etymology
Theseus was a legendary king of Athens.

References

Le Moult (E.) & Réal (P.), 1962–1963. Les Morpho d'Amérique du Sud et Centrale, Editions du cabinet entomologique E. Le Moult, Paris.

External links
"Morpho Fabricius, 1807" at Markku Savela's Lepidoptera and Some Other Life Forms
Butterflies of America Images of type and other specimens.
NSG Photographs of voucher specimen.
Mariposa Mexicanas Photographs of subspecies oaxacensis
Taxonomy Browser Upperside and underside photographs.

Morpho